Frank Louis MacCormack (born September 21, 1954) is a former Major League Baseball pitcher for the Detroit Tigers and Seattle Mariners.

Born in Jersey City, New Jersey, MacCormack was raised in Secaucus, New Jersey and played prep baseball at Weehawken High School, graduating in 1971.

References

External links

1954 births
Living people
Baseball players from Jersey City, New Jersey
Major League Baseball pitchers
Detroit Tigers players
Seattle Mariners players
Evansville Triplets players
Montgomery Rebels players
Lakeland Tigers players
Toledo Mud Hens players
San Jose Missions players
Bellingham Mariners players
People from Secaucus, New Jersey
Rutgers Scarlet Knights baseball players
Weehawken High School alumni